Bluey and Curley is an Australian newspaper comic strip written by the Australian artist, caricaturist, and cartoonist Alex Gurney.

Few original Bluey and Curley strips are held in public collections, because Gurney often gave the original art work of his caricatures, cartoons, and comic strips to anyone who asked. Following Gurney's death in 1955, the strip was taken over by Norm Rice in early 1956, but he died in a vehicle accident that year. Bluey and Curley was then taken over by cartoonist Les Dixon who drew it for 18 years until he retired in 1975.

Characters
The first Bluey and Curley strip appeared soon after the start of World War II. It featured two Australian soldiers, Bluey (who had served in the First AIF), and Curley, a new recruit.

By the end of the war, they had served in every Australian campaign — in North Africa, in the Middle East, in New Guinea, in Northern Australia, and in the Pacific Islands — and, once the war was over, they even went to London and took part in the 1946 Victory Parade.

Creation
By 1939, Alex Gurney was already well established as a caricaturist, cartoonist, and comic strip artist.

In late 1939, following the outbreak of World War II, he created his most famous characters, Bluey and Curley, which first appeared in the Picture-News magazine.

He applied for the copyright registration of Bluey and Curley on 16 October 1939; and his application was granted on 9 November 1939 (Australian Copyright No.6921).

Syndication
It was transferred to The Sun News-Pictorial in 1940, from whence it was syndicated throughout Australia, New Zealand and Canada.

Cultural impact
The strip featured a pair of soldiers, "Bluey" (named for his red hair), the Great War veteran who had re-enlisted in the second A.I.F., and Curley (named for his extremely curly hair), the new recruit to the A.I.F.

The strip was widely appreciated for the good-humoured way it depicted the Australian "diggers" and their "mateship", as well as for its realistic use of Australian idiom of the day.

Service life
Gurney visited army camps throughout Australia and New Guinea to ensure authenticity. While in New Guinea he contracted malaria and was incapacitated for some time.

Post-war life
Gurney was in England in June 1946, as part of an Australian Press Syndicate sent specifically to view the Victory Parade. As well as sending caricatures of various eminent people involved in that parade back to Australia for distribution through the press, he also used the opportunity to have Bluey and Curley attend the parade, and a number of his Bluey and Curley comic strips reflected that event.

Gurney's visit to London, and his version of events, as seen through his Bluey and Curley comic strip, was also historically significant for another reason: it was the first time that a newspaper comic strip had ever been transmitted from England to Australia by radio.<ref>[http://nla.gov.au/nla.news-article59356273 Bluey and Curley by Radio from London, The (Perth) Sunday Times, Sunday 9 June 1946), p.2.]</ref>

Although Bluey and Curley were popular with Australians because they related to the slang, attitude, and the lack of respect towards authority exhibited by the main characters, the strip lost some of its appeal and readership when the pair returned to "civvy street".

Gurney's death
Gurney died suddenly, of heart disease, on 4 December 1955. He had collapsed in his car parked outside his home.

Post-Gurney
The strip was later drawn by Norman Howard Rice (1911–1956). Rice died as the result of a car accident on 31 December 1956 (New Year's Eve). The strip was then drawn by Les Dixon from 1957 until 1975.

Film
The comic was adapted into a TV film Mud, Bloody Mud in 1985.

The Original

Footnotes

References

 Gurney, Margaret, My Dad: Alex Gurney 1902-1955, M. Gurney, (Black Rock), 2006.
 Gurney,  John & Dunstan, Keith, Gurney and Bluey and Curley: Alex Gurney and his Greatest Cartoons, Macmillan, (South Melbourne), 1986.
 Hetherington, J., "Bluey's Creator Was Hobart Student", The Mercury, (Saturday, 28 July 1951), p.4.
 Hetherington, J., "He's the Boss of Bluey and Curley", The Barrier Miner, (Thursday, 2 August 1951), p.4.
 The Cartoonist Wields a Mighty Pen, The (Adelaide) Mail, (Saturday, 28 January 1933), p.13.
 Meet Alex Gurney — Creator of Bluey and Curley, The Sunday Times Magazine, The (Perth) Sunday Times, (Sunday, 17 August 1947), p.9.
 J.A., ""Bluey and Curley" Creator in Perth, The Sunday Times Magazine, The (Perth) Sunday Times, (Sunday, 15 May 1949), p.15.
 Now, Meet Their Maker, The Sunday Times Magazine, The (Perth) Sunday Times, (Sunday, 12 August 1951), p.4.
 Eidelson, M., "Bluey and Curley", Flood, Fire, and Fever: A History of Elwood, Prahran Mechanics' Institute Press, (Windsor), 2006. 
 Lindesay, Vane, "Alex Gurney: Creator of Bluey and Curley", The La Trobe Journal, No 82, (Spring 2008), pp.59-65. 
 Stanley, P, "Remembering the war in New Guinea, The real Bluey and Curley: Australian images and idioms in the island campaigns", Symposium Paper, Australia-Japan Research Project, 2000.
 Famous Strip Creator Dead, The Age, (Monday, 5 December), p.3.
 Panozzo, S., "Gurney, Alexander George (Alex) (1902 - 1955)", Australian Dictionary of Biography, (1996).
 Kendig, D., "Alex Gurney", The Funnies Paper, (November/December 2000), pp. 24–26.
 Gurney, Alex (1902–55), p. 334 in Wilde, H.W., Hooton, J.W. & Andrews, B.G., Oxford Companion to Australian Literature (Second Revised Edition)'', Oxford University Press, (Melbourne), 1994

Australian comic strips
Military humor
Military comics
1939 comics debuts
Comics characters introduced in 1939
1975 comics endings
Comic strip duos
Fictional Australian people
Fictional Australian Army personnel
Fictional World War II veterans
Australian comics characters
Male characters in comics
Australian comics adapted into films